The 121st Fighter Aviation Squadron (Serbo-Croatian:  / 121. ловачка авијацијска ескадрила) was an aviation squadron of Yugoslav Air Force established in April, 1961 as part of 83rd Fighter Aviation Regiment at Zemunik military airport.

It was equipped with US-made North American F-86E Sabre jet fighter aircraft.

In 1963 the 83rd Fighter Aviation Regiment with its both squadrons (120th and 121st Fighter Aviation Squadron) has been dislocated from Zemunik to Titograd military airport.

By the end of year 1964 the 83rd Fighter Aviation Regiment has been disbanded. The 121st Fighter Aviation Squadron was also disbanded. Its personnel and equipment were attached to 120th Fighter Aviation Squadron.

Assignments
83rd Fighter Aviation Regiment (1961-1964)

Bases stationed
Zemunik (1961–1963)
Golubovci (1963–1964)

Equipment
North American F-86E Sabre (1961–1964)

References

Yugoslav Air Force squadrons
Military units and formations established in 1961
Military units and formations disestablished in 1964